Amélie Mauresmo was the defending champion, and successfully defended her title, defeating Kim Clijsters in the final 3–6, 6–3, 6–3.

Seeds
The top four seeds receive a bye into the second round.

Draw

Finals

Top half

Bottom half

References
 Main and Qualifying Rounds

2006 Singles
2006 WTA Tour
2006 in Belgian tennis